HSBC Global Private Banking is part of the Wealth and Personal Banking division within the HSBC Group (as of 2020, HSBC was the world's sixth largest bank by total assets and market capitalization) They provide award winning private banking services to wealthy individuals and families including billionaires as well as multi-millionaire business owners, entrepreneurs and investors. 

Headquartered in London, there are 45 Global Private Banking offices worldwide including hubs across Europe, Americas and Middle East coupled with a strong history and presence in Asia. Employing over 3,000 people, the business was responsible for USD 427bn assets under management in 2021. 

Services and opportunities offered include advisory or discretionary investing traditional banking, financing, family office governance, sustainable and alternative investing, succession planning and trust management via teams of specialists including Relationship Managers, Credit Advisors and Investment Counsellors.

HSBC Global Private Banking has been named the Best Private Bank in both UK and Hong Kong by PWM consistently over the last 5 years as well as Best Global Private Bank for Digital Customer Experience in 2020.

See also

Swiss Leaks

References

External links
 

Private Bank